Kenya participated in the 2010 Summer Youth Olympics in Singapore.

The planned Kenyan squad consisted of 10 athletes competing in 3 sports: Aquatics (Swimming), Athletics and Sailing.

Medalists

Athletics

Boys
Track and Road Events

Girls
Track and Road Events

Sailing

One Person Dinghy

Swimming

References

External links
Competitors List: Kenya

Nations at the 2010 Summer Youth Olympics
2010 in Kenyan sport
Kenya at the Youth Olympics